Patti Assembly constituency may refer to 
 Patti, Punjab Assembly constituency
 Patti, Uttar Pradesh Assembly constituency